Rugby sevens was one of the 42 sports at the 16th Asian Games 2010 at Guangzhou, China. It was held at the Guangzhou University Town Stadium.

Schedule

Medalists

Medal table

Draw
The draw ceremony for the team sports was held on 7 October 2010 at Guangzhou.

Men
The teams were seeded according to their position at the 2006 Asian Games.

Pool A
 (1)
 (5)
 (7)

Pool B
 (2)
 (3)
 (6)
 (8)

Women
The teams were seeded based on their final ranking at the 2010 Asian Women's Sevens Championship.

Pool A
 (1)
 (3)
 (5)
 (8)*
 (13)

Pool B
 (2)
 (4)
 (6)
 (11)

* Withdrew.

Final standing

Men

Women

References

Official Website

 
rugby union
2010
2010 rugby sevens competitions
International rugby union competitions hosted by China
2010 in Asian rugby union